Qurbanzadə (also, Kurbanzade) is a village and municipality in the Goranboy Rayon of Azerbaijan.  It has a population of 583.

References 

Populated places in Goranboy District